Malta participated in the Eurovision Song Contest 2018 with the song "Taboo" written by Johnny Sanchez, Thomas G:son, Christabelle Borg and Muxu. The song was performed by Christabelle. The Maltese entry for the 2018 contest in Lisbon, Portugal was selected through the national final Malta Eurovision Song Contest 2018, organised by the Maltese broadcaster Public Broadcasting Services (PBS). The competition consisted of a final held on 3 February 2018, where "Taboo" performed by Christabelle eventually emerged as the winning entry after scoring the most points from a five-member jury and a public televote.

Malta was drawn to compete in the second semi-final of the Eurovision Song Contest which took place on 10 May 2018. Performing during the show in position 12, "Taboo" was not announced among the top 10 entries of the second semi-final and therefore did not qualify to compete in the final on 12 May. It was later revealed that Malta placed thirteenth out of the 18 participating countries in the semi-final with 101 points.

Background 

Prior to the 2018 contest, Malta had participated in the Eurovision Song Contest thirty times since its first entry in 1971. Malta briefly competed in the Eurovision Song Contest in the 1970s before withdrawing for sixteen years. The country had, to this point, competed in every contest since returning in 1991. Malta's best placing in the contest thus far was second, which it achieved on two occasions: in 2002 with the song "7th Wonder" performed by Ira Losco and in the 2005 contest with the song "Angel" performed by Chiara.

For the 2018 Contest, the Maltese national broadcaster, Public Broadcasting Services (PBS), broadcast the event within Malta and organised the selection process for the nation's entry. Malta selected their entry consistently through a national final procedure, a method that was continued for their 2018 participation.

Before Eurovision

Malta Eurovision Song Contest 2018
Malta Eurovision Song Contest 2018 was the national final format developed by PBS to select the Maltese entry for the Eurovision Song Contest 2018. The competition consisted of a final held on 3 February 2018 at the Malta Fairs and Conventions Centre in Ta' Qali, hosted by radio presenter Colin Fitz and broadcast on Television Malta (TVM) as well on the broadcaster's website tvm.com.mt.

Format
The competition consisted of sixteen songs competing in the final on 3 February 2018. Five judges evaluated the songs during the show and the results of the public televote had a weighting equal to the total votes of the judges. The five members of the jury that evaluated the entries during the final consisted of:

 Regína Ósk (Iceland) – Singer, represented Iceland in the 2008 contest as member of the group Euroband
 Jan Bors (Czech Republic) – Head of Delegation for Czech Republic at the Eurovision Song Contest
 Kleart Duraj (Albania) – Head of Delegation for Albania at the Eurovision Song Contest
 Meri Popova (Macedonia) – Head of Delegation for Macedonia at the Eurovision Song Contest
 Bruno Santori (Italy) – Conductor

Competing entries
Artists and composers were able to submit their entries between 30 June 2017 and 1 September 2017. Songwriters from any nationality were able to submit songs as long as the artist were Maltese or possessed Maltese citizenship. Artists were able to submit as many songs as they wished, however, they could only compete with a maximum of one in the final. 2017 national final winner Claudia Faniello was unable to compete due to a rule that prevented the previous winner from competing in the following competition. 129 entries were received by the broadcaster. On 15 September 2017, PBS announced a shortlist of 30 entries that had progressed through the selection process. The sixteen songs selected by a seven-member international jury consisting of representatives from several countries along with local experts from Malta to compete in the final were announced on 11 October 2017.

Among the selected competing artists was former Maltese Eurovision entrant Richard Micallef (performing with Joe Micallef) who represented Malta in the 2014 contest as member of the group Firelight. On 19 January 2018, a new version of "Dai Laga" performed by Aidan was released at the request of PBS as the original version of the song was said to have breached EBU regulations due to it including some instrumental music that may have been bought via the internet by the composer.

Final 
The final took place on 3 February 2018. Sixteen entries competed and the 50/50 combination of votes of a five-member jury panel and the results of public televoting determined the winner. The show was opened with a guest performance of "Breathlessly" performed by 2017 Maltese Eurovision entrant Claudia Faniello, while the interval act featured further performances by Faniello as well as performances by 2017 Maltese Junior Eurovision entrant Gianluca Cilla, the Analise Dance Studio and the Kinetic Dance Studio. After the votes from the jury panel and televote were combined, "Taboo" performed by Christabelle was the winner. Each point awarded by the public televote equated to approximately 37 votes.

At Eurovision 
According to Eurovision rules, all nations with the exceptions of the host country and the "Big Five" (France, Germany, Italy, Spain and the United Kingdom) are required to qualify from one of two semi-finals in order to compete for the final; the top ten countries from each semi-final progress to the final. The European Broadcasting Union (EBU) split up the competing countries into six different pots based on voting patterns from previous contests, with countries with favourable voting histories put into the same pot. On 29 January 2018, a special allocation draw was held which placed each country into one of the two semi-finals, as well as which half of the show they would perform in. Malta was placed into the second semi-final, to be held on 10 May 2018, and was scheduled to perform in the second half of the show.

Once all the competing songs for the 2018 contest had been released, the running order for the semi-finals was decided by the shows' producers rather than through another draw, so that similar songs were not placed next to each other. Malta was set to perform in position 12, following the entry from Poland and preceding the entry from Hungary.

Voting
Voting during the three shows involved each country awarding two sets of points from 1-8, 10 and 12: one from their professional jury and the other from televoting. Each nation's jury consisted of five music industry professionals who are citizens of the country they represent, with their names published before the contest to ensure transparency. This jury judged each entry based on: vocal capacity; the stage performance; the song's composition and originality; and the overall impression by the act. In addition, no member of a national jury was permitted to be related in any way to any of the competing acts in such a way that they cannot vote impartially and independently. The individual rankings of each jury member as well as the nation's televoting results were released shortly after the grand final.

Points awarded to Malta

Points awarded by Malta

Detailed voting results
The following members comprised the Maltese jury:
 Elton Zarb (jury chairperson)composer, musician, producer
 Dorian Cassarradio and TV presenter, business owner
 Olwyn Jo Salibaproducer, video editor
 Alexander Kitcherevent coordinator, technical director at Valletta 2018 Foundation
 Amber Bondinmusic artist, represented Malta in the 2015 contest

Notes and references

Notes

References

2018
Countries in the Eurovision Song Contest 2018
Eurovision